is a J-pop singer, songwriter who is a member of Por, a duo which she and Ryo formed. Momo is a former member of the Japanese music production, I've Sound.

Chronology 
 1995—P・o・r was formed
 2001—The name "P・o・r" changed as "Por". Momo joined I've Sound.
 2005—Live concert in Nippon Budokan (I've in Budokan 2005: Open the Birth Gate)
 2006—Momo graduated from I've Sound and continued her singing career with her group Por.
 2009—Por breaks up and Momo, who changed her name to Hitomi Momoi, her real name, stars her solo career and publishes her first single, "Yuudachi". In this single, she counts with the collaboration of Atsuhiko Nakatsubo and Fish Tone, former I've Sound instrumentists. The single contains two songs: One of them is the one that gives the name of the single and the B side's title is "Hanausagi".

Discography

Albums

Solo albums

As P.O.R

Singles

Maxi Singles

As P.O.R

Other songs

Solo works

I've Sound works

As I've Special Unit

As P.O.R 

Footnotes
 — = N/A

References

External links 
 Official site
 POR official site (defunct, archived)
 【置顶】Momo歌词集 – I've Sound 音樂聯盟
 Momoの一日一幸 – livedoor Blog

1974 births
Living people
Musicians from Sapporo
I've Sound members
21st-century Japanese singers
21st-century Japanese women singers